The 2012 Sri Lanka Premier League season was the debut edition of the Sri Lanka Premier League, established by Sri Lanka Cricket in 2011. The season ran from 11 to 31 August 2012. The tournament was originally scheduled to begin in 2011 but it was postponed to 2012, with the former Inter-Provincial Twenty20 taking its place.

Format
The tournament had a group stage and a knockout stage. The seven teams played in a single round-robin tournament in the group stage and the top four teams qualified for the semi-finals. The winners of the semi-finals played in the final.

Venues
All of the matches in the tournament were played at Pallekele International Cricket Stadium, Kandy and R Premadasa Stadium, Colombo.

Player draft

The draft was held on 5 July 2012 for international players and on 6 July for local players. 56 international players were drafted and comprised mostly Australian and Pakistani players. 107 local players were drafted.

Opening ceremony
The opening ceremony was held on 10 August 2012 at the Sugathadasa Stadium in Colombo.

Teams and standings

Note: Top four teams qualify for the semi-finals.

League progression

Note: The total points at the end of each group match are listed.
Note: Click on the points (group matches) or W/L (knockout) to see the summary for the match.

Fixtures
All match times in Sri Lanka Standard Time (UTC+05:30)

Group stage

Knockout stage

Semi-finals

Final

Statistics

Most runs
The top five highest run scorers (total runs) in the season are included in this table.

Most wickets
The following table contains the five leading wicket-takers of the season.

Special awards

References

External links
Official website
Tournament site on ESPN CricInfo

Sri Lanka Premier League
Sri Lanka Premier League
2012 in Sri Lankan cricket